Waldstadion is a 4,999-capacity stadium located in Giessen, Germany. It is home to FC Gießen. The stadium has also been used for major rock concerts and festivals.

References

Football venues in Germany